Cyclopentane (also called C pentane) is a highly flammable alicyclic hydrocarbon with chemical formula C5H10 and CAS number 287-92-3, consisting of a ring of five carbon atoms each bonded with two hydrogen atoms above and below the plane. It occurs as a colorless liquid with a petrol-like odor. Its melting point is −94 °C and its boiling point is 49 °C. Cyclopentane is in the class of cycloalkanes, being alkanes that have one or more rings of carbon atoms. It is formed by cracking cyclohexane in the presence of alumina at a high temperature and pressure.

It was first prepared in 1893 by the German chemist Johannes Wislicenus.

Production, occurrence and use
Cycloalkanes are formed by catalytic reforming. For example, when passed over a hot platinum surfact, 2-methylbutane converts into cyclopentane.

Cyclopentane has found applications in various industries. As a volatile hydrocarbon it is an incidental component of some fuels and blowing agents. In recent years, cyclopentane has been used as a refrigerant to replace chlorofluorocarbons (CFCs) and hydrofluorocarbons (HFCs) as it does not deplete the ozone layer and has a much lower global warming potential than HFC refrigerants. Cyclopentane requires safety precautions to prevent leakage and ignition when used as a refrigerant as it is highly flammable. 

Such species are conceivable refrigerants and specialty solvents.

The cyclopentane ring is pervasive in natural products including many useful drugs.  Examples include most steroids, prostaglandins, and some lipids.

Conformations

In a regular pentagon the angles at the vertices are all 108°, slightly less than the bond angle in perfectly tetrahedrally bonded carbon, which is about 109.47°. But cyclopentane is not planar in its normal conformations. It puckers in order to increase the distances between the hydrogen atoms (something which does not happen in the planar cyclopentadienyl anion  because it doesn't have as many hydrogen atoms). This means that the average C-C-C angle is less than 108°. There are two conformations that give local minima of the energy, the "envelope" and the "half-chair". The envelope has mirror symmetry (C), while the half chair has two-fold rotational symmetry (C). In both cases the symmetry implies that there are two pairs of equal C-C-C angles and one C-C-C angle that has no pair. In fact for cyclopentane, unlike for cyclohexane (C6H12, see cyclohexane conformation) and higher cycloalkanes, it is not possible geometrically for all the angles and bond lengths to be equal except if it is in the form of a flat regular pentagon.

References

External links

Cyclopentanes
Hydrocarbon solvents
Cycloalkanes